Papakula is a monotypic genus of  nursery web spiders containing the single species, Papakula niveopunctata. It was first described by Embrik Strand in 1911, and is only found on the Aru Islands.

See also
 List of Pisauridae species

References

Monotypic Araneomorphae genera
Pisauridae
Spiders of Indonesia
Taxa named by Embrik Strand